Roxana Judkins Stinchfield Ferris (April 13, 1895 – June 30, 1978) was an American botanist.

She was born in Sycamore, California, to Moses and Annie Stinchfield. She was named after her grandmother, Roxany Judkins.

In 1916, Stinchfield Ferris earned a Master of Arts in Botany at Stanford University with advisor and mentor, LeRoy Abrams and afterwards she joined the staff of the Dudley Herbarium at Stanford, collecting thousands of botanical specimens for the research collection there. She specialized in collecting Phanerogams, and the botany of California and Mexico.
Stinchfield Ferris retired from the Dudley Herbarium in 1963, and died in Palo Alto in 1978.

Works 
 The trees and shrubs of western Oregon
 An Illustrated Flora of the Pacific States (as co-editor)
 Death Valley Wildflowers
 Flowers of Point Reyes National Seashore
Native Shrubs of the San Francisco Bay Region
New Combinations in Aster

Species named in honor
Several species have been named in honor of Ferris including
Astragalus tener var. ferrisiae - Ferris's milk-vetch
Eremogone ferrisiae - Ferris's sandwort
Lasthenia ferrisiae - Ferris's goldfields

References

External links 

 Brief biography on JSTOR
 The trees and shrubs of western Oregon at WorldCat

1895 births
1978 deaths
People from Colusa County, California
American botanists
Scientists from California
Women botanists
20th-century American women scientists
20th-century American scientists